Cytochrome b5 reductase 2 is an enzyme that in humans is encoded by the CYB5R2 gene.

References

External links

Further reading